Liga Gimel (lit. League C) is the fifth and bottom division of Israeli Football League, a position it has held since 2009. From Liga Alef and downwards to this, each league is separated by region as well.

History
Liga Gimel was first established in 1951 as a third division, below Liga Alef and Liga Bet. In 1955, after designating the first tier as Liga Leumit, Liga Gimel was demoted to the fourth tier. Further demotions followed in 1976, after the second tier Liga Artzit to the fifth tier and in 1999, after the establishment of Liga Ha'Al to the sixth tier. At the end of the 2008–09 season, Liga Artzit was scrapped and Liga Gimel was brought up back to the fifth tier.

Since its establishment Liga Gimel was divided into geographical divisions, to lower operating costs for the clubs, the number of which changed according to the number of club which registered, with as many as 16 divisions in the 1966–68 season. During this period promotion to Liga Bet alternated between direct promotion and through promotion play-offs, which were used to set eight teams for promotion. Following the establishment of Liga Dalet, in 1969, Liga Gimel were divided into 8 divisions, from which one team was promoted directly to Liga Bet and one relegated to Liga Dalet. After the dissolution of Liga Dalet, in 1985, and until the end of the 2001–02 season, the league was divided into 12 divisions, with promotion playoffs.

Although currently Liga Gimel is the bottom tier in the Israeli league pyramid, from 1969–70 and up until the 1984-85 season a further tier, Liga Dalet was below Liga Gimel, until it was scrapped due to declining number of teams.

Structure
Since the 2013–14 season, Liga Gimel consists of eight divisions, four in the northern district and four in the southern district. Each league may contain between 12 and 16 clubs.

The top club from each division is promoted at the end of the season to Liga Bet (the fourth level). Teams are assigned to their new Liga Bet divisions based on their geographical locations, with each of two division feeding to its corresponding Liga Bet division (Upper Galilee and Lower Galilee to Liga Bet North A, Jezreel and Samaria to North B, Sharon and Tel Aviv to South A and Center and South to South B). The second and third placed teams in each division enter a promotion/relegation play-off, at the end of which four teams from Liga Gimel meet the loser of the Liga Bet relegation play-off match (between the 13th and 14th placed team in their corresponding division) for a place in Liga Bet.
As it is the lowest division, no clubs are relegated.

Current members
The following teams participating at the 2020-2021 season:

Liga Gimel Upper Galilee
Hapoel Bnei Bi'ina
Hapoel Bnei Deir Al-Asad
Hapoel Deir Hanna
Hapoel Nahariya
Hapoel Shlomi
Hapoel Tarshiha
Maccabi Abu Snan
Maccabi Bnei Jadeidi-Makr

Liga Gimel Lower Galilee
Ahali Tamra
Beitar Kafr Kanna
F.C. Bu'eine-Nujidat
F.C. Sallama-Misgav
F.C. Tzeirei Tur'an
Ihud Bnei Kafr Yasif
Ironi Bnei Sha'ab
Maccabi Basmat Tab'un
Maccabi Ironi Yafa
Maccabi Tabbash

Liga Gimel Jezreel
Beitar Afula
Beitar Ein Mahil
Beitar Umm al-Fahm
Bnei Musheirifa Baiada
Bnei Umm al-Fahm Al Halal
F.C. Bnei Yafa
F.C. Kfar Kama
Hapeol Al-Batuf
Hapoel al-Ittihad Nazareth
Hapoel Ein as-Sahla
Ihud Tzeiri Iksal
Maccabi Ahva Fureidis
Maccabi Ein Mahil Gamel

Liga Gimel Samaria
Beitar Kiryat Ata Kfir
Beitar Pardes Hanna
F.C. Bnei Qalansawe
F.C. Tzeiri Haifa
Hapoel Bnei Jisr az-Zarqa
Hapoel Daliyat al-Karmel
Hapoel Or Akiva
Hapoel Yokneam 
Maccabi Barkai 
Maccabi Isfiya
Maccabi Kiryat Yam

Liga Gimel Sharon
Maccabi Givat Shmuel F.C.
Beitar Nes Tubruk
Beitar R.C. Shomron
Bnei Tira
F.C. Bnei Ra'anana
F.C. Ironi Ariel
F.C. Kafr Qasim Nibrass
F.C. Netanya
F.C. Tzeiri Tira
Hapoel Jaljulia
Hapoel Oranit
Maccabi HaSharon Netanya

Liga Gimel Tel Aviv
Agudat Sport Holon
Elitzur Jaffa Tel Aviv
Elitzur Yehud Yotel
Bnei Yehud
Hapoel Neve Golan
Maccabi Pardes Katz
Maccabi Ironi Or Yehuda
Maccabi Spartak Ramat Gan
Beitar Jaffa Zion
Beitar Ezra
Maccabi HaShikma Ramat Hen
Hapoel Tzafririm Holon
Inter Aliyah F.C.
Hapoel Ramat Yisrael
Shikun Vatikim Ramat Gan

Liga Gimel Central
Beitar Gan Yavne
Beitar Gedera
Beitar Giv'at Ze'ev
Bnei Yeechalal Rehovot
F.C. Ashdod City
F.C. Jerusalem
F.C. Ramla
F.C. Rishon LeZion
F.C. Tzeirei Lod
Hapoel Ashdod
Hapoel Mevaseret Zion
Hapoel Nachlat Yehuda
Hapoel Ramla
Hapoel Tirat Shalom
Maccabi Kiryat Ekron

Liga Gimel South
Maccabi Ashkelon
F.C. Be'er Sheva Haim Levy
F.C. Maccabi Yeruham
F.C. Tzeirei al-Hoshla
Hapoel Masos/Segev Shalom
Hapoel Mateh Yehuda
Hapoel Rahat
Hapoel Sderot
Ironi Beit Shemesh
Maccabi Be'er Sheva
Maccabi Dimona
Maccabi Ironi Hura
Otzma Be'er Sheva
Tzeiri Lakiya

Defunct division champions (since 1996–97)
Western Galilee
1996–97: Hapoel Kabul
1998–99: Maccabi Ironi Shlomi
1999–2000: Hapoel Maghar
2000-2001:Hapoel Karmiel
2003-04: Hapoel Bnei Julis
2004-05: Beitar Ihud Mashhad

Bay Area
1996–97: Ironi I'billin
1998–99: Hapoel Kaukab
1999–2000: Hapoel Bnei Manda

Haifa
1996–97: Hapoel Daliyat al-Karmel
1998–99: Hapoel Tel Hanan
1999–2000: Maccabi Tzur Shalom

Gush Dan
1996–97: Hapoel Jaljulia
1997–98: Hapoel Mahane Yehuda
1998–99: Maccabi Bnei Tira
1999–2000: Maccabi Yehud

External links
Israel Football Association

 
5
Isr
Professional sports leagues in Israel